{{Infobox officeholder
| honorific_prefix    = Shrimant| name                = Vishwas Rao
| honorific_suffix    = 
| image               = File:Vishwasrao Ballal Peshwa.jpg
| caption             = Potrait of Vishwasrao Bhat at Peshwa memorial, Pune
| office1             = Heir apparent to the throne of the Peshwa of the Maratha Empire
| monarch1            = 
| term_start1         = 1751
| term_end1           = 14 January 1761
| birth_date          = 1742
| death_date          = 
| birth_place         = Shaniwarwada, Pune, Maratha Empire
| death_place         = Panipat, Maratha Empire
| allegiance          = Maratha Empire
| battles             = Third Battle of Panipat
| spouse              = Lakshmibai (Maiden Name Durgabai Dikshit-Patwardhan)
| parents             = Balaji Baji Rao (father)Gopikabai (Mother)
| relations           = Madhavrao I (Brother)Narayan Rao (Brother)Sadashivrao Bhau  (Uncle)Raghunathrao  (Uncle)Shamsher Bahadur I  (Uncle)
Baji Rao I(Grandfather)
Kashibai(Grandmother)
| leader              = Sadashivrao Bhau
| monarch             = Rajaram II
| primeminister       = Balaji Baji Rao
| residence           = Shaniwar wada, Poona
}}Vishwasrao Bhat' (22 July 1742 – 14 January 1761) was the eldest son of Peshwa Balaji Baji Rao of the Maratha Empire and also was the heir to the title of Peshwa.

Vishwasrao had received training in administration and warfare from the age of 8 years. He had impressed the Maratha infantry. His specialities were swordsmanship and archery. Although, he looked exactly like the younger version of his grandfather Baji Rao I , Vishwasrao had blue eyes. As per Marathi historian Sardesai and few other writers wrote in their respective books that, he was the most handsome among the Peshwa men. Vishwasrao use to follow a strenuous gym routine and performed Kawaiti (Eng: Exercises). Writer Kaustubh Kasture states in his book, Sakalraj Karya Dhurandar Sadashivrao Bhausaheb that Sadashivrao Bhau, his paternal uncle made sure that Vishwasrao take military training. As per some sources, it seems that it was Nanasaheb Peshwa who introduced regular army training and added the best armour to the Maratha army.
 
Vishwasrao was the leader of Maratha Empire army during Third Battle of Panipat in 1761, although his uncle Sadashivrao Bhau was main leader and Vishwasrao was nominal leader. Vishwasrao got hit in the head by a bullet fired by a Pashtun officer during the period of the most intense fighting (Approx. between 01:00 PM and 02:30 PM) at this battle.  He died fighting on the front lines. Marathas were winning the battle but some contingents charged ahead of their cue and obstructed the cannon lines creating a problem for Ibrahim Khan Gardi at aiming for the enemies. As per Grant Duff, upon hearing about Shrimant Vishwasrao's death Malharrao Holkar retreated from the field with at least 10,000 soldiers and sardars. He also took men of significance like Damaji Gaekwad with him. He went to Delhi and asked people of significance like Vinchurkar to vacate Delhi.

Although Vishwas Rao Bhat was first exposed to actual warfare at Sindkheda near Hyderabad, against Nizam in 1756, he was the nominal Commander of Maratha Forces and the Peshwa's representative during Third Battle of Panipat under guidance of his uncle Sadashivrao Bhau.

At the time of the battle, the Maratha Empire was in control of about two-thirds of the Indian subcontinent (including areas of the modern Republic of India and Pakistan).

 Early life 

Vishwasrao was born as the eldest son of Balaji Baji Rao at Supe near Pune (Supe was the Jagir of Shahaji near Pune). He was trained in Administrative matters and was exposed to Military training early in his life. Viswasrao had inherited the looks of his grandfather Bajirao and had even exceeded his charm. G. S. Sardesai writes that none was there with more handsome-looks in Peshwa lineage than this Viswas Rao. Raghunath Yadav author of one of the Panipat Bakhar had stated "पुरुषात देखणा विश्वासराव" ("The one most handsome among all men Vishwasrao.")

Marriage 
Vishwasrao was married to Lakshmibai on 2 May 1750, the daughter of Hari Balkrushn Dikshit-Patwardhan. 

 Death 
Shrimant Vishwasrao had sensed that there could be a debacle on the final day of battle although Abdali was receding. There was no food and Sadashivrao, Parvatibai and Vishwasrao were pretending to be on a fast taking the moral responsibility. Meanwhile, they were trying to make food available to the soldiers. Shrimant Jankoji Shinde urged him to write a letter to Nanasaheb Peshwa asking for help. Worrying, that he wouldn't let his ever victorious and righteous uncle Sadashivrao lose his streak in front of the gilchas, Vishwasrao wrote a letter to Nanasaheb. In that letter he urged Nanasaheb to bring in more soldiers, money and food to help Bhausaheb. Shrimant Vishwasrao wrote that his own life was not important as Nanasaheb had two more sons. However, if he were to lose a brother and the nation a patriotic leader like Bhausaheb then that loss would be irreparable. His fears came out to be true as due to some deceit, Najib Khan, Abdali's friend and Malharrao Holkar's foster son was able to murder Mehendale while he was returning victorious from a skirmish prior to the battle. Bhausaheb was at a personal loss and without a commander.  During the battle of Udgir, Shrimant Vishwasrao had established himself as the rising valorous Maratha leader. He successfully led the troops and fought alongside Shrimant Jankoji Shinde. The two were very close friends. Even the valorous Tukoji and Mahadji Shinde were having faith in their captain, Bhausaheb. They had vowed to fight till their last breath. Trusting, his fiercely loyal and able young team, he made Vishwasrao a commander in the Third Battle of Panipat. On the final day, Shrimant Vishwasrao went to the battlefield with no morsel of food relying only on sugared water like the rest of the Maratha warriors. While he was fiercely fighting on the front lines, as he was hit by an arrow on his shoulder, a shot hit his head while he was lying down, injured.

In popular culture
 In the 1994 Hindi TV series The Great Maratha, Vishwasrao's character was portrayed by Sanjay Sharma.
 In the 2019 film, Panipat, Vishwasrao's character was portrayed by Abhishek Nigam.
 In the 2019 Marathi TV series Swamini'',  Vishwasrao's character was portrayed by Sujit Deshpande. 

 Maratha Empire
 Bhat family
 Maratha emperors
 18th century

References

External links 
https://mafiadoc.com/hindu-pad-padashahi_5a1cac031723dd4f437b5e76.html
http://www.smartyoungsters.com/2019/09/mee-radhika-book-3the-starry-night-at.html?

1741 births
1761 deaths
People of the Maratha Empire